Hristo Botev Radio (Bulgarian: Програма Христо Ботев) is a state-owned Bulgarian radio station, part of the Bulgarian National Radio Network. Hristo Botev Radio broadcasts around the clock and is dedicated to culture and education.

Music
Classical music, opera, and concerts are broadcast in high-quality sound, often live and before an audience. Journalistic commentaries as well as interviews with the artists feature throughout. The station's website has also a section for streaming live concerts so they can be heard online.

Programmes
Hristo Botev is the only Bulgarian radio station to broadcast radio drama, foreign-language courses, and educational programmes based on contemporary international issues. On Monday to Friday mornings there is the talk show "Our Day" ("Нашият ден") with specialised content for each day of the week - economics, law, social, domestic, and foreign politics. From 3:00 to 5:00 o'clock there is the classical music programme "Euroclassic Notturno" ("Еврокласик ноктюрно"). On Saturday mornings six hours of programming under the overall title of "Family Radio" ("Семейно радио") presents a wide range of information and entertainment for all, together with audience participation. Other programmes include the humorous "Comic Academy" ("Академия комика") and "Cabaret" ("Кабаре"); items for children; and several programmes dedicated to folk traditions, religion, European integration, and (uniquely among Bulgarian radio stations) the country's different ethnic groups.

Broadcast frequencies

External links
Official website
Euroclassic Notturno (Еврокласик ноктюрно)

Radio stations in Bulgaria